Seven Idiots is a studio album by World's End Girlfriend. It was originally released via Virgin Babylon Records in Japan on 14 September 2010. It peaked at number 86 on the Oricon Albums Chart. It was re-released via Erased Tapes Records in Europe and North America the following year. A music video was created for "Les Enfants du Paradis".

Critical reception

Jedd Beaudoin of PopMatters gave the album 9 out of 10 stars, commenting that "Japanese genius World's End Girlfriend returns with a seriously strange and beautiful range of songs, sounds, and styles on its latest release, Seven Idiots." Meanwhile, Ned Raggett of AllMusic gave the album 3.5 out of 5 stars, calling it "a series of achievements that are unquestionably technically impressive, yet ultimately tiring when piled one on top of the other."

Track listing

Personnel
Credits adapted from liner notes.

 World's End Girlfriend – music
 Katsuhiko Maeda – guitar
 Takuto Uzuno – guitar
 Mio Okamura – violin
 Seigen Tokuzawa – cello 
 Ken-ichi Matsumoto – saxophone

Charts

References

External links
 

2010 albums
World's End Girlfriend albums
Erased Tapes Records albums